Pasco–Hernando State College (PHSC) is a public college in Florida with campuses in Pasco and Hernando counties. It is part of the Florida College System and has additional campuses in Brooksville, Dade City, New Port Richey, Spring Hill, and Wesley Chapel. The name of the school changed from Pasco-Hernando Community College (PHCC) to Pasco–Hernando State College (PHSC) on January 21, 2014.

History
PHSC was established in 1967 by the Florida Legislature and is accredited by the Commission on Colleges of the Southern Association of Colleges and Schools to award the associate degree, as well as two bachelor's degrees. The college also offers other certification programs in computer science, health care, and law enforcement. Some of the newest programs include the Associate in Science in Professional Pilot Technology and the Associate in Science in Aviation Administration both of which PHSC began offering in the fall of 2017. Additional aviation programs, Aviation Maintenance Administration and Unmanned Vehicle Systems Operations Associate in Science (AS) degrees, have recently been approved by Southern Association of Colleges and Schools Commission on Colleges (SACSCOC) and are slated to begin in 2018. PHSC also offers dual-enrollment classes for high school students. Many students select the four-year state college as an alternative to higher priced four-year institutions with the prospect of transferring.

A fifth campus opened in 2014 in Wesley Chapel to serve central Pasco County. The new campus is named the Porter Campus at Wiregrass Ranch after the Porter family which donated the land to the college.

In March 2013 PHCC President Katherine Johnson announced plans to change the college's name to correlate with the beginning of offering baccalaureate programs in 2014. The school sought public feedback via its website regarding four proposed new names: College of Pasco-Hernando, Pasco-Hernando College, Pasco–Hernando State College, or State College of Pasco-Hernando.

Notable alumni

See also 
 Florida College System

References

External links 
 

Buildings and structures in Hernando County, Florida
Buildings and structures in Pasco County, Florida
Educational institutions established in 1967
Universities and colleges accredited by the Southern Association of Colleges and Schools
Education in Hernando County, Florida
Education in Pasco County, Florida
Florida College System
1967 establishments in Florida
NJCAA athletics